Fisc may refer to:

fisc, taxes paid in kind, especially those of the Frankish kings, or a knight's money holder

As an acronym, FISC may refer to:
 Farm and Industry Short Course, a farmer-based program through the University of Wisconsin-Madison College of Agricultural and Life Sciences
 fast instruction set computer, a term used in computer science describing a CPU where the notion of complex instruction set computing (CISC) and reduced instruction set computing (RISC) have become deprecated
 Fleet and Industrial Supply Center, an archaic name for an installation of a NAVSUP Fleet Logistics Center maintained by the Naval Supply Systems Command of the United States Navy 

 United States Foreign Intelligence Surveillance Court (also known as the FISA Court), a U.S. federal court

See also
fiscus, the personal treasury of the emperors of Rome